The 13th European Acrobatics Championships was held in Rennes, France  25–28 November 1992.

Results

Medal table

Participating nations

References

External links
European Union of Gymnastics

European Acrobatics Championships
1992 in gymnastics
1992 in French sport
International gymnastics competitions hosted by France